Imran Nahumarury (born 12 November 1978) is a retired Indonesian football player and manager who previously played as midfielder for PSB Bogor, Persikota Tangerang, Persija Jakarta, Persib Bandung, Persita Tangerang, Persikabo Bogor, PSSB Bireuen and the Indonesia national team.

Club statistics

International career
Imran's international career began in 1999 and finished in 2002. His last call-up for the national team was for the 2002 Tiger Cup. He scored his first goals on 20 November 1999 against Cambodia in the 2000 AFC Asian Cup qualification.

International goals

|}

Honours

Clubs

Player
Persija Jakarta :
Liga Indonesia Premier Division champions : 1 (2001)

Manager

Individual

 Liga 1 Coach of the Month: September 2021

References

1978 births
Living people
People from Tulehu
Indonesian footballers
Indonesia international footballers
PSB Bogor players
Persikota Tangerang players
Persija Jakarta players
Persib Bandung players
Persita Tangerang players
Persikabo Bogor players
PSSB Bireuen players
Sportspeople from Maluku (province)
Indonesian Premier Division players
Association football midfielders
2000 AFC Asian Cup players
PSIM Yogyakarta managers